Nanosocialism refers generally to a set of economic theories of social organization advocating state or collective ownership and administration of the research, development and use of nanotechnology.

Politics 

Nanosocialism is a stance that favors participatory politics to guide state intervention in the effort to manage the transition to a society revolutionized by molecular nanotechnology.

"Nanosocialism" is a term coined by David M. Berube, the associate director of Nanoscience and Technology Studies at the USC NanoCenter, who argues that nanotechnological projections need to be tempered by technorealism about the implications of nanotechnology in a technocapitalist society, but that its applications also offer enormous opportunities for economic abundance and social progress.

In popular culture

In the role-playing game Transhuman Space, nanosocialism is described as a descendant of infosocialism, in which intellectual property is nationalized and freely distributed by the state. It is adopted by some developing nations to counter the hold corporations from wealthier nations have on copyrights and patents. This fictional version of nanosocialism was coined by David L. Pulver, the game's creator, who was unaware that the term had already been used by Berube.

See also
 Post-scarcity economy

References

Socialism
Political neologisms
Technology neologisms
Technology in society
Nanotechnology
Political science terminology
Technological utopianism